Sébastien Siani (born 21 December 1986) is a Cameroonian professional footballer who plays as a midfielder for Belgian National Division 1 club Knokke.

Career
Siani played four years for the Kadji Sports Academy, before transferring to Union Douala in July 2004.

Siani moved to Europe joining Anderlecht in July 2005 before leaving for Zulte-Waregem on a half-year loan a year later. In the 2007–08 season he played one season on loan at Union Saint-Gilloise. One year later, he signed to Sint-Truiden on loan.

On 11 July 2018, Al Jazira has signed Cameroonian midfielder Sébastien Siani for on seasons by buying the player's card from Royal Antwerp represent Al Jazira from the new season of the UAE Pro-League.

In July 2021, after being a free agent for a year, Siani signed a two-year contract with Knokke.

International career
Siani debuted for the Cameroon national football team in a friendly against Nigeria on 10 October 2015.

Honours

Country
Cameroon
 Africa Cup of Nations: 2017

International goals
Scores and results list Cameroon's goal tally first.

References

1986 births
Living people
Footballers from Douala
Association football midfielders
Cameroonian footballers
Cameroon international footballers
Cameroonian expatriate footballers
Belgian Pro League players
Challenger Pro League players
UAE Pro League players
Kadji Sports Academy players
Union Douala players
R.S.C. Anderlecht players
Royale Union Saint-Gilloise players
S.V. Zulte Waregem players
Sint-Truidense V.V. players
R.W.D.M. Brussels F.C. players
K.V. Oostende players
Royal Antwerp F.C. players
Al Jazira Club players
Ajman Club players
2017 Africa Cup of Nations players
2017 FIFA Confederations Cup players
Cameroonian expatriate sportspeople in Belgium
Expatriate footballers in Belgium
Cameroonian expatriate sportspeople in the United Arab Emirates
Expatriate footballers in the United Arab Emirates